Coleophora keireuki is a moth of the family Coleophoridae. It is found in Turkestan and Uzbekistan.

The larvae feed on the leaves of Caroxylon species, including Caroxylon orientalis. They create a leafy, tubular, straight case. It consists of two to three cylindrical pieces. No expansion of the case takes place. The surface is completely covered with leaf pubescence. The valve is three-sided. Larvae can be found from May to the beginning of October. There are at least two generations per year.

References

keireuki
Moths described in 1970
Moths of Asia